Acanthinula is a genus of minute, air-breathing land snails, terrestrial pulmonate gastropod mollusks or micromollusks in the family Valloniidae.

Species 
The genus Acanthinula contains the following species:
 Acanthinula aculeata (Müller, 1774) - type species
 Acanthinula spinifera Mousson, 1872

References 

Valloniidae
Taxonomy articles created by Polbot